The Mercedes-Benz OM904 is a 4.2 liter (4,249cc) Inline-four engine (I4) OHV Diesel engine with 3 valves per cylinder. It is related to the OM906 Straight-six engine which has two extra cylinders, while the bore and stroke remain unchanged.

It launched in 1996 and had a Unit injector system to deliver fuel to every cylinder. It used a twin-scroll Turbocharger that was giving ~0.5-1.4atm of boost.

Torque Curve

See also 
 List of Mercedes-Benz engines

References 

Diesel engines
OM904